is a Japanese politician of the Liberal Democratic Party, a member of the House of Councillors in the Diet (national legislature). A native of Uguisuzawa, Miyagi and graduate of the University of Tokyo, he worked at the Ministry of Construction from 1961 to 1994. He was elected for the first time in 1995.

References 
 

Members of the House of Councillors (Japan)
Living people
1937 births
Liberal Democratic Party (Japan) politicians